The Lazarus Project is a 2008 novel by Bosnian fiction writer and journalist Aleksandar Hemon. It features the true story of the death of Lazarus Averbuch, a teenaged Jewish immigrant to Chicago who was shot and killed by a police officer in 1908. It was a finalist for the 2008 National Book Award and National Book Critics Circle Award, as well as the winner of the inaugural Jan Michalski Prize for Literature in 2010.

Reception
The Lazarus Project received starred reviews from Booklist, Kirkus Reviews, and Publishers Weekly.

Kirkus called the book "[a] literary page-turner that combines narrative momentum with meditations on identity and mortality."

Glyn Maxwell with London Review of Books commented, "Stories. True stories, false stories, good stories, rotten stories. Everything in Hemon’s beautiful new novel trembles within this matrix, where a story’s force or charm is at least as significant as its veracity."

Numerous reviewers highlighted Hemon's prose. Publishers Weekly said, "Hemon’s workmanlike prose underscores his piercing wit, and between the murders that bookend the novel, there’s pathos and outrage enough to chip away at even the hardest of hearts." Booklist's Donna Seaman agreed with the sentiment: "Hemon’s sentences seethe and hiss, their dangerous beauty matched by Velibor Bozovic’s eloquent black-and-white photographs, creating an excoriating novel of rare moral clarity." Carol Anshaw, writing for Los Angeles Times added, "Hemon is immensely talented-a natural storyteller and a poet, a maker of amazing, gorgeous sentences in what is his second language."

Writing for the New York Times, Cathleen Schine says the book is "a remarkable, and remarkably entertaining, chronicle of loss and hopelessness and cruelty propelled by an eloquent, irritable existential unease. It is, against all odds, full of humor and full of jokes." 

Writing for The Guardian, James Lasdun provided a negative review, noting The Lazarus Project is one of several recent books that orbit these subjects. Its sentiments are all very correct and laudable, but as a novel it seems to me largely a failure. It opts, initially, for the oblique angle... Period reconstruction clearly isn't Hemon's game... What seem to interest him more are the various practical and metaphysical questions raised by his own desire to tell the story. The result is a familiar postmodern construction: a novel about the writing of a novel ...Lacking the pressure of a plot, these passages stake everything on their pure interest as writing.

See also
Isaiah Eleven (2008) novel set in Chicago

References

External links
"Raising the Dead", book review by Cathleen Schine, May 25, New York Times Book Review.

2008 American novels
Novels set in Chicago
Postmodern novels